Vahlodea is a monotypic genus of plants in the grass family. The only known species is Vahlodea atropurpurea 

Its native range is the subarctic (such as Greenland), to temperate parts of the Northern Hemisphere. From (Europe within; Finland,  North European Russia, Norway and Sweden,) to Asia within (Japan, Kamchatka, Kuril Islands, Magadan and Taiwan,) and in North America (within the Canadian provinces of; Alberta, British Columbia, Manitoba, Newfoundland and Labrador, Northwest Territories, Nunavut, Ontario, Québec and Yukon and within the USA states of; Alaska, the Aleutian Islands, California, Colorado, Idaho, Maine, Montana, New Hampshire, New York, Oregon, Vermont, Washington and Wyoming,) and also southern South America (within Argentina and Chile).

The genus name of Vahlodea is in honour of Jens Vahl (1796–1854), a Danish botanist and pharmacist. The Latin specific epithet of atropurpurea means "dark-purple coloured".
Both the genus and the sole species were first described and published in Bot. Not. (1842) Vol.141 on page 178 in 1842.

The genus is recognized by the United States Department of Agriculture and the Agricultural Research Service, and they list Vahlodea atropurpurea as the known species.

It was thought to be a synonym of Deschampsia , but Chiapella, J. 2007. A molecular phylogenetic study of Deschampsia (Poaceae: Aveneae) inferred from nuclear ITS and plastid trnL sequence data: support for the recognition of Avenella and Vahlodea. Taxon 56:55-64.

References

Pooideae
Monotypic Poaceae genera
Plants described in 1842
Flora of Northern Europe
Flora of North European Russia
Flora of the Russian Far East
Flora of Japan
Flora of Taiwan
Flora of Subarctic America
Flora of Western Canada
Flora of Eastern Canada
Flora of the Northwestern United States
Flora of Maine
Flora of New Hampshire
Flora of New York (state)
Flora of South Argentina
Flora of central Chile
Flora of southern Chile
Flora without expected TNC conservation status